Filab may refer to:
 Filab, Khuzestan
 Filab, Razavi Khorasan